The Pannonian Sea Museum is one part of the Ottó Herman Museum in Miskolc in Hungary. It contains geological exhibits from the Pannonian Sea.

The 7 million years old swarm cypresses and the exhibition 
2 brand new permanent exhibitions were opened in the “Pannonian Sea Museum” in Miskolc on 20 November 2013. The exhibition “On the paths of a primeval forest — The swamp cypress forest of Bükkábrány and its era” tells the visitors about the environment of the 7 million years old swamp cypresses in Bükkábrány in a playful environment. Besides fossils of several prehistoric animals and plants, Rudapithecus fossils representing the beginning of human evolution, mysteries of paleo-magnetism, almost the whole spectrum of raw materials from the Miocene epoch and secrets of volcanic activities in the Pannonian Basin await curious visitors.

Other exhibits and programmes
The beautiful pieces of the collection “Minerals of the Carpathians” wer selected from the second largest Hungarian mineralogical collection. Our regular and periodical programmes are held in a conference room for 80 persons, in a projector room for 40 persons and a seminar-room for 15 persons and are assisted by a separate museum educational facility.

Gallery

External links
 Pannon Sea Museum
 Pannon Sea Museum 
 Museums in Miskolc 

Museums in Miskolc
Natural history museums in Hungary